First Presbyterian Church is located in central Davenport, Iowa, United States. It was listed on the National Register of Historic Places in 1983. The congregation is associated with the Presbyterian Church (USA).

History

Development
When the city of Davenport was formed in 1836 there were between 10 and 12 people who were Presbyterian. In the first couple of years they worshiped with other Protestant congregations. In April 1838 they formed their own congregation. They gathered in a small building owned by T.S. Hoge on Ripley Street between Front (present-day River Drive) and Second Streets. They managed the best they could with supply ministers who visited from time to time. The group was organized into a church on May 5, 1839, in a small frame school house on the corner of Fourth and Harrison Streets. The clergy in attendance at the service that day included Rev. Ithamar Pillsbury of Macomb, Illinois, Rev. M. Hummer of Stephenson (present-day Rock Island, Illinois) and the Rev. Enoch Mead of Rockingham, Iowa, which is now the southwest section of Davenport. They were also the supply clergy who visited the congregation occasionally. In 1842 J.M.D. Burrows and T.S. Hoge were chosen and ordained elders of the church.

Rev. Samuel Cleland had charge of the Davenport and Stephenson congregations for four years starting in 1843. At this time they built their first church in Davenport even though the congregation was still very small. In 1846 the congregation only numbered 17. From 1847 to 1849 the congregation was irregularly served by a pastor. Stability for the congregation came in November 1849 when the Rev. J.D. Mason became the pastor. At this time the church consisted of about 30 members. By 1857 the congregation had grown to 200.
  
The congregation built another church building in 1853 on Third Street between Harrison and Main Streets. In 1864 they sold that property and purchased the former St. Luke's Episcopal Church on Brady Street. This building served the congregation for over thirty years when the decision was made to build a new church closer to the center of the parish. The ground was broken for the new church at the corner of Kirkwood Boulevard and Iowa Street on March 18, 1898. The church's cornerstone was laid the same year on July 20, and the new church was dedicated on December 17, 1899. The old church became the Academy of Sciences, a forerunner of the Putnam Museum

Present Church
The new church was designed by the Galesburg, Illinois architectural firm of Gottschalk & Beadle. They were the same firm that designed an almost identical Central Congregational Church in Galesburg. The building is constructed of Marquette brownstone and it has a magnesian stain. The architectural style is Romanesque with a tower in the Richardsonian style. There are carved oak leaves and foliage on the gables in the Renaissance style. The interior is octagonal in shape and the ceiling is marked with a Maltese cross and a Greek cross. The stained glass windows were created by the J&R Lamb Studios of New York City.

The congregation continued to grow and by 1935 it numbered 1,300 people and was one of the largest congregations in the city.

Pipe organ
The Casavant Frères Ltée (1999, Op. 3455A) pipe organ is located in the front of the sanctuary with some pipes exposed. It features a traditional style console with a roll top. The organ is located in the center in a fixed position. It is equipped with four manuals, five divisions, 61 ranks, the manual compass is 61 notes, and the pedal compass is 32 notes. It has electric key action and electric stop action. The drawknobs are in vertical rows on angled jambs. There are balanced swell shoes/pedals in standard AGO placement. The combination action is a computerized/digital system. Rounding out the features are AGO Standard (concave radiating) pedalboard, crescendo pedal, reversible full organ/tutti thumb piston, reversible full organ/tutti toe stud, combination action thumb pistons, combination action toe studs, coupler reversible thumb pistons, and coupler reversible toe studs.

Stoplist:

GREAT ORGAN
16 Spitzflöte (ext)
8 Bordun (Sw)*
4 Oktave
2-2/3 Quinte
2 Oktave
1-3/5 Terz
VI Mixtur
16 Trompette
8 Trompete
8 Tuba (So)*
  Tremulant
  Chimes
  MIDI*

SWELL ORGAN
16 Bordun (ext)
8 Prinzipal*
8 Spitzgeigen
8 Vox Coelestis
8 Bordun
8 Flute douce*
8 Flute celeste*
4 Oktave
4 Rohrflöte
2 Gemshorn
IV Scharf
16 Klarinette
8 Trompete
4 Klarine
  Tremulant
  MIDI*

CHOIR ORGAN
8 Dulzflöte
8 Schwebung
8 Rohrgedackt
4 Traversflöte
2 Italienisch Prinzipal
1-1/3 Quinte
II Kornett
8 English Horn
8 Tuba (So)*
4 Tuba Clarion (So)*
  MIDI*

SOLO ORGAN*
8 Montre*
8 Flute majeure*
8 Flute harmonique*
4 Prestant*
II-IV Cornet*
8 Hautbois*
8 Tuba*
4 Tuba Clarion*

PEDAL ORGAN
32 Soubasse (Electronic)*
32 Bourdon (Electronic)*
16 Kontrabass
16 Spitzflöte (Gt)
16 Bordun (Sw)
8 Oktave
8 Spitzflöte (Gt)
8 Bordun (Sw)
III Theorbe*
IV Mixture
32 Contra Trompete (Electronic generators)*
16 Posaune
16 Trombone (Gt)
8 *Tuba (So)*
8 Trompete (ext)
4 Klarine (Sw)
4 Tuba Clarion (So)*

(*) Additions in 1988.

Other Presbyterian congregations
Other congregations sprang up in the city including First Associate Reformed Presbyterian in 1856. The congregation changed its name to United Presbyterian four years later, to McClellan Heights in 1907, and finally St. Andrew's in 1960. The congregation disbanded in 2008. Newcomb was organized by the YMCA in 1869 in the northwest part of the city. It became a mission of First Presbyterian between 1883 and 1916. Renwick Chapel was established in 1876. It had a succession of names including College Avenue Presbyterian, Second Presbyterian, and Mt. Ida Presbyterian. It no longer exists. West Park Presbyterian was founded in the mid-20th century on the west side of the city around the same time that Ridgeview Park Presbyterian was established in northwest Davenport. They merged in 2008 and formed New Hope.

References

External links

Church Website

Religious organizations established in 1838
Churches completed in 1899
19th-century Presbyterian church buildings in the United States
Churches in Davenport, Iowa
Churches on the National Register of Historic Places in Iowa
Romanesque Revival church buildings in Iowa
Richardsonian Romanesque architecture in Iowa
Presbyterian churches in Iowa
National Register of Historic Places in Davenport, Iowa
1838 establishments in Iowa Territory